The 1986 FIFA World Cup qualification UEFA Group 3 was a UEFA qualifying group for the 1986 FIFA World Cup. The group comprised England, Finland, Northern Ireland, Romania and Turkey.

The group was won by England with Northern Ireland as the runners up. Both teams qualified for the 1986 FIFA World Cup.

Standings

Results

Goalscorers

5 goals

 Bryan Robson

4 goals

 Mark Hateley
 Gheorghe Hagi

3 goals

 Gary Lineker
 Tony Woodcock
 Mika Lipponen
 Norman Whiteside
 Rodion Cǎmǎtaru

2 goals

 John Barnes
 Jari Rantanen

1 goal

 Viv Anderson
 Glenn Hoddle
 Kenny Sansom
 Chris Waddle
 Ari Hjelm
 Ari Valvee
 Gerry Armstrong
 John O'Neill
 Martin O'Neill
 Jimmy Quinn
 Marcel Coraş
 Ion Geolgǎu
 Gino Iorgulescu
 Ștefan Iovan
 Dorin Mateuţ
 Metin Tekin
 İlyas Tüfekçi

1 own goal

 Gino Iorgulescu (playing against Northern Ireland)

External links
Fifa.com page
Rsssf page
Results and Scorers

3
1984–85 in English football
qual
1984–85 in Northern Ireland association football
qualification
1984–85 in Romanian football
1985–86 in Romanian football
1984 in Finnish football
1985 in Finnish football
1984–85 in Turkish football
1985–86 in Turkish football
1983–84 in Northern Ireland association football